Mutinus borneensis is a species of fungus in the Phallaceae, or stinkhorn family. It was originally in described 1879 by Italian botanist Vincenzo de Cesati. The species has been collected from Borneo, China, and Australia.

References

External links
Mutinus borneensis at Index Fungorum

Phallales
Fungi of Australia
Fungi of China